The Sharon Osbourne Show is an American talk show that ran for one season (2003–2004) on various US channels.

Cancellation
The show was eventually canceled due to poor ratings and scathing attacks by critics as being too focused on Osbourne's family. Due to a disappointing array of guests including several little known actors, actresses and country music performers, Osbourne opted not to renew her contract.

International broadcasts
It was also shown in the UK on Sky One and on cable channel ARENA in Australia.

References

External links

2000s American television talk shows
2003 American television series debuts
2003 American television series endings
English-language television shows
First-run syndicated television programs in the United States
Television series by Warner Bros. Television Studios